Heliotrope is a lost 1920 American silent drama film directed by George D. Baker and written by Robert W. Chambers and Will M. Ritchey. The film stars Wilfred Lytell, Ben Hendricks Sr., Julia Swayne Gordon, Betty Hilburn, Diana Allen, and Frederick Burton. The film was released on November 28, 1920, by Paramount Pictures.

Cast
Wilfred Lytell as Jimmie Andrews
Ben Hendricks Sr. as Sol Goldman 
Julia Swayne Gordon as Josephine Hasdock
Betty Hilburn as Mabel Andrews
Diana Allen as Alice Hasdock
Frederick Burton as Heliotrope Harry Hasdock
Clayton White as George Andrews
William B. Mack as 'Spike' Foley
William H. Tooker as Governor Mercer
Thomas Findley as Warden Michael Pyne

References

External links 

 

1920 films
1920s English-language films
Silent American drama films
1920 drama films
Paramount Pictures films
Films directed by George D. Baker
American black-and-white films
American silent feature films
Lost American films
1920 lost films
Lost drama films
1920s American films